Mark Garalczyk (born August 12, 1964) is a former American football defensive tackle and defensive end. He played for the St. Louis Cardinals in 1987 and for the Phoenix Cardinals and New York Jets in 1988.

References

1964 births
Living people
American football defensive tackles
American football defensive ends
Western Michigan Broncos football players
St. Louis Cardinals (football) players
Phoenix Cardinals players
New York Jets players
National Football League replacement players